Robert Charles McMaster (1913 - July 6, 1986 Delaware, Ohio), a pioneer in nondestructive testing, was Regents Professor Emeritus of Welding Engineering and Electrical Engineering at Ohio State University (OSU).  He has more than 300 publications and 19 patents.

Education
McMaster earned a B.S. in 1936 in electrical engineering from Carnegie Mellon University ; an M.S. in 1938 in electrical engineering and a Ph.D. in electrical engineering and physics in 1944 from California Institute of Technology.  His Ph.D. research focused on the effects of light on power transmission lines.

Personal life
His daughter is novelist Lois McMaster Bujold.

References

1913 births
1986 deaths
American engineers
Carnegie Mellon University alumni
California Institute of Technology alumni
Ohio State University faculty
People from Delaware, Ohio
American electrical engineers